The Optimist is the eleventh album by rock band Anathema. The album was released on 9 June 2017, through Kscope, three years after their last release, Distant Satellites. The idea for The Optimist originated from the cover artwork of the album A Fine Day to Exit (2001). The coordinates from the first track are pointing to Silver Strand beach in San Diego County, the location that is shown on the cover of A Fine Day to Exit. The Optimist won "Album of the Year" at the 2017 Progressive Music Awards. It is the final album featuring bassist Jamie Cavanagh before he left the band a second time in 2018. It was the band's second UK Top 40 success, peaking at #34.

Background
The album reportedly follows the concept of the band's 2001 release A Fine Day to Exit. According to band members Daniel and Vincent Cavanagh, the idea came from writing a narrative, culminating on what must have happened with the guy from that album cover. Vincent commented that "The guy who disappeared – you never knew what happened to him. Did he start a new life? Did he succumb to his fate? It was never explained. The opening track title is the exact coordinates for Silver Strand beach in San Diego – the last known location of The Optimist – shown on the cover of A Fine Day to Exit". The covers of both albums also show its narrative connections, as the former contains a car in an empty beach during the day, and the latter a car in a road at night.

Critical reception

The album received positive reviews from music critics. At Metacritic, which assigns a normalized rating out of 100 to reviews from mainstream critics, the album received an average score of 80 based on eight reviews, indicating "generally favorable". Thom Jurek, reviewing for AllMusic, was highly positive about the release. He praised instrumental and vocal work on the album, as well the expansion of new elements in their music since the release of We're Here Because We're Here, "[...] widening a scope that would include more lush textures and atmospheres and result in some of their finest songs. Here Anathema have brought the experiments of the last seven years to a culmination of sorts." He then gave the album a score of 4 and a half starts out of 5. Jordan Blum of PopMatters was also very positive about the release, also praising the overall evolution of the band's sound, stating that "The Optimist isn't Anathema's finest effort yet, but again, that's more of a compliment to their other releases this decade than it is a knock against this one." He also cited the vocal duo of Vincent Cavanagh and Lee Douglas, the lyricism and the arrangements as highlights of the album, giving it a score of 8 out of 10. The diversity of elements, although praised by most reviewers, was criticized by some publishers. The Skinny's Pete Wild commented that, despite all the elements throughout their career, the band still failed to leave its mark on a mainstream audience. He concluded his review saying that it is an album for "our doomy times and is perhaps one best listened to at night, with a stiff drink in your hand and a serious expression on your face.", and gave it a score of 2 out of 5 stars.

Accolades

Track listing

Personnel
Daniel Cavanagh – guitars, vocals, keyboards, bass
Vincent Cavanagh – vocals, guitars, keyboards, programming, bass
Jamie Cavanagh – bass
John Douglas – drums, keyboards, programming
Lee Douglas – vocals
Daniel Cardoso – drums

Charts

References

2017 albums
Anathema (band) albums
Kscope albums
Albums produced by Tony Doogan